Alyssum alyssoides is a species of flowering plant in the mustard family known by several common names, including pale madwort and yellow alyssum. It is native to Eurasia, but it can be found throughout much of the temperate world as an introduced species and sometimes a common weed. For example, it has been noted as a weed in the western United States. It often appears in arable fields, sandy tracks, pits, and docks.

Description
This is a hairy annual or biennial herb producing stems which grow upright or lie along the ground to a maximum length of 30 to 40 centimeters. It produces yellow flowers May–July that fade to white with four small petals about 1.5–3 mm long. The fruit is a round, hairy capsule up to half a centimeter long. The hairs are branched, often stellate (star shaped). The seeds are tiny, 1–2 mm long, with minuscule wings. The leaves are simple, narrowly oblanceolate or linear with smooth margins, and are alternately arranged.

References

External links
Jepson Manual Treatment
USDA Plants Profile

alyssoides
Flora of Asia
Flora of Europe
Plants described in 1759
Taxa named by Carl Linnaeus